As of July 2017, VIM Airlines served the following destinations before the airline was shut down by November 2017.

Asia
Armenia
 Yerevan – Zvartnots International Airport

Azerbaijan 
 Ganja – Ganja International Airport

China
 Beijing - Beijing Capital International Airport
 Guangzhou – Guangzhou Baiyun International Airport seasonal charter
 Haikou - Haikou Meilan International Airport seasonal
 Shanghai - Shanghai Pudong International Airport

India
 Goa – Goa International Airport

Kyrgyzstan 
 Osh – Osh Airport

Tajikistan  
 Dushanbe – Dushanbe International Airport 
 Khujand – Khujand Airport
 Qurghonteppa – Qurghonteppa International Airport

Uzbekistan 
 Andizhan – Andizhan Airport
 Fergana – Fergana International Airport
 Namangan – Namangan Airport
 Qarshi – Karshi Airport
 Samarkand – Samarkand International Airport
 Termez – Termez Airport

Europe
Bulgaria
 Burgas - Burgas Airport seasonal charter
 Varna - Varna Airport seasonal charter

Cyprus
 Larnaca - Larnaca International Airport seasonal charter

Greece
 Corfu - Corfu International Airport seasonal charter
 Heraklion – Heraklion International Airport seasonal charter
 Kos - Kos Island International Airport seasonal charter
 Rhodes - Rhodes International Airport seasonal charter

Montenegro 
 Tivat – Tivat Airport seasonal charter

Russia
 Anadyr - Ugolny Airport
 Anapa - Anapa Airport
 Blagoveshchensk - Ignatyevo Airport
 Chelyabinsk - Chelyabinsk Airport
 Gelendzhik - Gelendzhik Airport
 Irkutsk - International Airport Irkutsk
 Kaliningrad - Khrabrovo Airport
 Kazan - Kazan International Airport
 Krasnodar - Krasnodar International Airport
 Magadan - Sokol Airport
 Moscow 
Domodedovo International Airport Base
Vnukovo International Airport
 Nizhny Novgorod - Strigino International Airport
 Novosibirsk - Tolmachevo Airport
 Omsk - Omsk Tsentralny Airport
 Pevek - Pevek Airport
 Rostov-on-Don - Rostov-on-Don Airport
 Saint Petersburg - Pulkovo International Airport Focus city
 Samara - Kurumoch International Airport
 Simferopol - Simferopol International Airport
 Sochi - Sochi International Airport
 Tyumen - Roshchino International Airport
 Ufa - Ufa International Airport
 Ulan-Ude - Baikal International Airport
 Yekaterinburg - Koltsovo Airport

Spain
 Barcelona – El Prat Airport seasonal charter
 Tenerife – Tenerife South Airport

See also	
 VIM Airlines

References

External links 
 VIM Airlines destination list

Lists of airline destinations